The Mormon Flat Dam is a dam on the Salt River located Northeast of Phoenix, Arizona.

The dam is 380 feet long, 224 feet high and was built between 1923–25. It is named after nearby Mormon Flat, a place where Latter-day Saints (Mormon) settlers from Utah stopped to camp. There are two hydroelectric generating units in the dam; rated at 10,000  and 50,000 kW. The dam forms Canyon Lake as it slows the passage of the Salt River.

The dam was listed on the National Register of Historic Places in 2017.

External links

 SRP Water Operations: Mormon Flat Dam
 

Dams in Arizona
Hydroelectric power plants in Arizona
Buildings and structures in Maricopa County, Arizona
United States Bureau of Reclamation dams
Dams completed in 1925
Dams on the Salt River (Arizona)
Historic American Engineering Record in Arizona
National Register of Historic Places in Maricopa County, Arizona
Dams on the National Register of Historic Places in Arizona